The Hospital of Santa Maria Nuova (i.e. Ospedale di Santa Maria Nuova in Italian) is the oldest hospital still active in Florence, Italy.

History and artistic profile

Origins

The hospital was founded in 1288 by Folco Portinari, the father of Beatrice beloved by Dante. Folco was convinced to build the hospital by Monna Tessa, matriarch of the family, whose remains are buried under the tombstone is still visible in the Cloister of the Bones of the Hospital.

This is one of the oldest and most important Florentine welfare institutions which became over the centuries very rich and powerful, thanks to the many legacies and donations. Besides the historical perspective, the hospital has a rich artistic legacy due to the profusion of decorations by some of the best Florentine artists over the centuries. Unfortunately, hospital needs have in many instances come into conflict with the need for conservation of artistic works. As such, there are many masterpieces in museums located nearby, such as Spedale degli Innocenti and San Marco Museum. The hospital was divided into two areas, female (woman's ward) and male (men's ward), and can accommodate about two hundred patients.

15th century

In the fifteenth century, the hospital enjoyed remarkable economic prosperity and in 1419 received a visit from Pope Martin V. In 1420 the addition of the cloister of the medical center by Bicci di Lorenzo marked a major transformation and expansion of the original building. The addition still has a terracotta lunette depicting the Pietà by Giovanni della Robbia and clay sculpture with the Madonna with Child and two angels, attributed to Michelozzo. In the early decades of the fifteenth century the aisles were decorated by Niccolò di Pietro Gerini with frescoes that are now partially preserved in the original locations and some were detached and placed in the living room of Pope Martin V where they now have the office of the hospital president. In the Cloister of the Bones was a detached fresco representing Last Judgment by Fra Bartolomeo, now at San Marco Museum.

16th century 
Further works were done in the late sixteenth century by important artists: 
 Giambologna made stuccos in a lane of the men's ward
 Alessandro Allori painted frescoes in the men's ward chapel
 Bernardo Buontalenti painted frescoes in the walls and ceiling of the women's ward
These works have been moved to the Pinacoteca of the Spedale degli Innocenti. Bernardo Buontalenti designed the large porch that is the main entrance to the hospital and regrettably did not live long enough to see its implementation. Construction of the porch was begun in 1611 by Giulio Parigi and finally brought to completion in 1960.

17th century 
In 1660 the old lanes of the women's ward were replaced by Giovanni Battista Pieratti with a new more spacious environment.

Pope Martin V Administrative Hall 
In the administrative hall (room and lounge of the hospital president), which are accessed by a staircase in the Cloister of Bones, there are frescos and other works from the facade of the Church of Sant'Egidio and from other monasteries. The works in this hall are/have been:
"The Crucifixion with Saints Romuald and John the Baptist" by Andrea del Castagno (1440-1444), now in the cloister of Church of Santa Maria degli Angeli.
"The Coronation of the Virgin", a terracotta sculpture attributed to Dello Delli, now in the portal of the Church of Sant'Egidio (which has been replaced by a cast).
"Consecration of the new church of Sant'Egidio by Pope Martin V", a sinopia by Lorenzo di Bicci removed from the facade of the Church of Sant'Egidio.
 "Pope Martin V confirming the privileges of the hospital", a detached fresco originally performed circa 1473 by Gherardo di Giovanni and said to have been repainted in 1560 by Francesco Brina, from the facade of the Church of Sant'Egidio.

The Cloister of Bones 

The Cloister of Bones, a temple and formerly a burial site, was built in the nineteenth century by Costoli in pietra serena. The temple has columns and pillars and on the center is the statue of the Marquis Angiolo Galli Tassi. The statue has the inscription in the back: "From the benefactor to the beneficiaries - Year 1863". On the front the statue has the following inscription: "Count Angiolo Galli - that emulating the love of the ancients - the ancestral heritage linked - to hospitals in Tuscany". There is also an inscription with the sculpture of Monna Tessa, the inspiration of the legendary Folco Portinari, from the church of Santa Margherita de' Cerchi.

Departments and hospital services 
 Emergency department
 Clinical Observation
 General Surgery
 Dermatology
 Medicine
 Psychiatry
 Intensive Care
 U.T.I.C.
 Day hospital doctor
 Day hospital oncology
 Radiology
 Laboratory analysis
 Neurology
 Endoscopy
 Dermatological Allergy
 Sexually Transmitted Diseases

Famous interns 
 Leonardo da Vinci, Circa 1507-1508
 Paolo Mascagni, 1801
 François Carlo Antommarchi, 1809
 Sarah Parker Remond, 1866-1868

Further reading 
 For an extensive listing of art works at the complex of Santa Maria Nuova, and works that were transferred to other locations like the Uffizi and the Galleria dell' Accademia see it.wiki

References

External links 

 

Hospitals in Florence
1288 establishments in Europe
13th-century establishments in the Republic of Florence
Hospitals established in the 13th century